John Francis Maisto (born August 28, 1938, Braddock, Pennsylvania) is a retired U.S. career diplomat, who rose from Foreign Service Officer to eventually serve as a U.S. Ambassador in a number of postings.

Early life and career progress
Maisto earned his BS from the Edmund A. Walsh School of Foreign Service at Georgetown University, then earned his MA at the University of San Carlos, Guatemala. After graduation, Maisto joined the United States Department of State as a Foreign Service Officer in 1968.

Early postings included working with the State Department's Information Agency in Argentina and Bolivia. He was later posted to positions at the US Embassies in the Philippines, Bolivia and Costa Rica. Maisto then served in postings as Director of the State Department’s Office of Philippine Affairs (within the Bureau of East Asian and Pacific Affairs), and then the Deputy Chief of Mission in Panama.

In 1989, Maisto served as the Deputy U.S. Representative to the Organization of American States, then became the Deputy Assistant Secretary of State for Central American Affairs (reporting to the Assistant Secretary of State for Western Hemisphere Affairs) in 1992.

United States Ambassador
In 1993, Maisto was nominated by President Bill Clinton to be the United States Ambassador to Nicaragua, serving in that position until November 1996. In March 1997, Maisto became the Ambassador to Venezuela, serving in that position until August 2000.

Maisto returned to the United States, and served as a Foreign Policy Advisor for the United States Southern Command for the next few months. In January 2001, with the inauguration of President George W. Bush, Maisto was brought in as a Special Assistant to the President and Senior Director for Western Hemisphere Affairs to National Secretary Advisor Condoleezza Rice.

In 2003, President Bush nominated Maisto to be the Ambassador to the Organization of American States, serving until March 2007.

References

Sources
United States Department of State: Biography of John F. Maisto
United States Department of State: Ambassadors to the Organization of American States

1938 births
Living people
Ambassadors of the United States to Nicaragua
Walsh School of Foreign Service alumni
Permanent Representatives of the United States to the Organization of American States
Ambassadors of the United States to Venezuela
United States Foreign Service personnel